Ann Elizabeth Oldfield Butler-Sloss, Baroness Butler-Sloss, GBE, PC (née Havers; born 10 August 1933), is a retired English judge. She was the first female Lord Justice of Appeal and was the highest-ranking female judge in the United Kingdom until 2004, when Baroness Hale was appointed to the House of Lords. Until June 2007, she chaired the inquests into the deaths of Diana, Princess of Wales, and Dodi Fayed. She stood down from that task with effect from that date, and the inquest was conducted by Lord Justice Scott Baker.

Early life
The daughter of Sir Cecil Havers, a judge, and Enid Flo Havers (née Snelling), she was sister to the late Lord Chancellor, The Lord Havers, and is aunt to his sons, the actor Nigel Havers and the barrister Philip Havers. She was educated at Broomfield House School in Kew, in West London, and Wycombe Abbey School in High Wycombe in Buckinghamshire, followed by a year at the University of Lausanne. She passed the bar without a university degree.

She stood as the Conservative candidate for Vauxhall in the 1958 London County Council election, and the equivalent constituency in the 1959 general election, where she won 38% of the vote, but was defeated by the Labour MP George Strauss.

Legal career
She was called to the Bar from the Inner Temple in 1955. In 1958, she married Joseph Butler-Sloss. She was appointed a Registrar at the Principal Registry of the Family Division in 1970. In 1979, she became the fourth woman to be appointed a High Court judge, after Elizabeth Lane, Rose Heilbron, and Margaret Booth. As were all previous female High Court judges, she was assigned to the Family Division. She was also made a Dame Commander of the Most Excellent Order of the British Empire (DBE).

In 1988, she became the first woman appointed as a Lord Justice of Appeal (judge of the Court of Appeal), having chaired the Cleveland child abuse inquiry in the previous year. In 1999, she became President of the Family Division of the High Court of Justice, the first woman to hold this position and the highest-ranking woman judge in the United Kingdom until Brenda Hale became the first female Lord of Appeal in Ordinary, in January 2004.  She was known officially as "Lord Justice Butler-Sloss" until Bingham MR issued a practice direction in 1994 to refer to her informally as "Lady Justice Butler-Sloss"; the official title in s2(3) of the Senior Courts Act 1981 was amended by the Courts Act 2003.

She was advanced to the rank of Dame Grand Cross of the Most Excellent Order of the British Empire (GBE) in the 2005 New Year Honours. On 12 January 2005, it was announced that she was retiring, being replaced as President of the Family Division by Sir Mark Potter, then a Lord Justice of Appeal. On 3 May 2006, it was announced by the House of Lords Appointments Commission that she would be one of seven new life peers – so-called 'people's peers'. She was created Baroness Butler-Sloss, of Marsh Green in the County of Devon, on 13 June 2006, sitting as a crossbencher. On 4 August 2006 she was appointed to the Court of Ecclesiastical Causes Reserved for a period of five years.

On 7 September 2006, she was appointed as Deputy Coroner of the Queen's Household and Assistant Deputy Coroner for Surrey for the purpose of hearing the inquest into the death of Diana, Princess of Wales.

On 2 March 2007, she was appointed as Assistant Deputy Coroner for Inner West London for the purpose of transferring the jurisdiction of the inquest to Inner West London so that the proceedings may sit in the Royal Courts of Justice. On 24 April 2007, she announced she was stepping down in June 2007, saying she lacked the experience required to deal with an inquest with a jury. The role of coroner for the inquests was transferred to Lord Justice Scott Baker. This had been preceded by the overturning by the High Court of her earlier decision to hold the inquest without a jury.

She became Chancellor of the University of the West of England in 1993 and an Honorary Fellow of St Hilda's College, Oxford, Peterhouse, Cambridge, Corpus Christi College, Cambridge, King's College London, the Royal College of Physicians, the Royal College of Psychiatrists and the Royal College of Paediatrics and Child Health. She sits on the Selection Panel for Queen's Counsel. In December 2004 she was awarded an Honorary Doctor of Laws from the University of Bath, and in June 2005 she was awarded an honorary degree from the Open University as Doctor of the University. She was Chairman of the Security Commission prior to its abolition in 2010.

On 8 July 2014, it was announced that Baroness Butler-Sloss would chair the forthcoming large-scale inquiry into cases of child sex abuse in previous decades. She stood down on 14 July after mounting pressure from victims' groups and MPs over her suitability regarding the fact that her brother was the Attorney General at the time of some of the abuses in question and her perceived unwillingness to include mention of former Anglican bishop Peter Ball.

Personal life
She and her husband, Joseph William Alexander Butler-Sloss, have three children:
Hon. Frances Ann Josephine Butler-Sloss (now Richmond) (b. 13 October 1959)
Hon. Robert Joseph Neville Galmoye Butler-Sloss (b. 15 July 1962); married Hon. Sarah Jane Sainsbury, daughter of Lord Sainsbury of Preston Candover, President of Sainsbury's
Hon. William Edmund Minchin Patchell Butler-Sloss (b. 21 September 1967, d. 13 March 2018); married Victoria Harwood, a voice actress and author. William died of stomach cancer in 2018 at the age of 50. He was survived by two children and his widow.

Baroness Butler-Sloss is a church-going Anglican. In 2002, she chaired the Crown Appointments Committee charged with the selection of a new Archbishop of Canterbury. She was Chairman of the Advisory Council of St Paul's Cathedral from 2000–2009 and currently serves as Chair for the Commission on Religion and Belief in British Public Life. , she lives in East Devon.

Notable judgments
 Joyce v Sengupta and Another: CA 31 Jul [1992] – Newspaper can be sued for malicious falsehood
Re T (Consent to Medical Treatment)(Adult Patient) [1993] Fam. 95
Re W, Re A, Re B (Change of Name) [1999] EWCA Civ 2030
Re J (Specific Issue Orders: Child’s Religious Upbringing and Circumcision) [2000] 1 FLR 571 CA
An NHS Trust A v M and An NHS Trust B v H [2001] Fam 348
Re B (Consent to Treatment: Capacity) [2002] EWHC 429

Arms

Baroness Butler-Sloss' arms are a version of the arms borne by her brother, Michael Havers, Baron Havers.

See also

Ms B v An NHS Hospital Trust

References

External links

No-nonsense approach of the right-to-die judge – Profile of Butler-Sloss at Guardian Unlimited, 22 March 2002
Announcement of her introduction at the House of Lords, House of Lords minutes of proceedings, 25 July 2006
Commission on Religion and Belief in British Public Life

1933 births
Living people
English barristers
English legal professionals
English women judges
Dames Grand Cross of the Order of the British Empire
English Anglicans
Family Division judges
Fellows of King's College London
Fellows of Corpus Christi College, Cambridge
Fellows of Peterhouse, Cambridge
Life peeresses created by Elizabeth II
Members of the Inner Temple
Members of the Privy Council of the United Kingdom
People associated with the University of the West of England, Bristol
People from Buckinghamshire
People's peers
Crossbench life peers
People educated at Wycombe Abbey
British women lawyers
Elizabeth
Lady Justices of Appeal
Lawyers from Devon
Presidents of the Family Division